The Attawapiskat First Nation ( Cree:  , "People of the parting of the rocks";) is an isolated First Nation located in Kenora District in northern Ontario, Canada, at the mouth of the Attawapiskat River on James Bay. The traditional territory of the Attawapiskat First Nation extends beyond their reserve up the coast to Hudson Bay and hundreds of kilometres inland along river tributaries. The community is connected to other towns along the shore of James Bay by the seasonal ice road/winter road constructed each December, linking it to the towns of Kashechewan First Nation, Fort Albany, and Moosonee (Minkin 2008:1) Attawapiskat, Fort Albany, and Kashechewan operate and manage the James Bay Winter Road through the jointly owned Kimesskanemenow Corporation, named after the Cree word for "our road" -kimesskanemenow. Attawapiskat is the most remote northerly link on the  road to Moosonee. They control the reserves at Attawapiskat 91 and Attawapiskat 91A.

Etymology
Attawapiskat means "people of the parting of the rocks" from the Swampy Cree language . These formations (and therefore the river and community) are called  in Swampy Cree.

History

Attawapiskat is home to the Mushkego, Omushkego James Bay Cree. They are also known as Mushkegowuk Cree Omushkegowuk Cree, western James Bay, west-coast, Swampy, Omushkego, and Hudson Bay Lowland Cree (General 2012:2). The town site has for centuries been a gathering place for local Native people; they used and occupied a much larger area for their seasonal camps and hunting seasons. Originally this was a seasonal camp that the people visited only in the spring and summer to take advantage of the fishing on one of the main rivers of James Bay. Historically, in the wintertime, families moved to more dispersed sites along the coast, inland or on Akimiski Island, where they trapped, hunted, and gathered roots, fruit and nuts. (General 2012:iii). The latter is also known as "Agamiski and Atimiski Island, and less commonly as Agumiski, Akamiski, Kamanski, Viner's Island, and Oubaskou."(General 2012:5).

Attawapiskat was entered into treaty with Canada relatively late, in 1930 (Treaty 9 adhesion). The majority of the First Nation members moved to the community as late as the mid-1960s. Many have maintained traditional structures, thinking and interpretation of life in a deeper fashion than in other, less isolated First Nations communities. Some elders lead a traditional life on the land, moving into the community only during Christmas season. Some families, although having their home base in the community, use the land extensively as their economic and social basis. The vast majority of community members are involved in the annual goose hunts in fall and spring. Most of the Attawapiskat First Nation members are aware of their traditions.

Since the 1950s, Attawapiskat has developed from a settlement of temporary dwellings, such as tents and teepees, to a community with permanent buildings. These were constructed in the late 1960s and early 1970s. Traditional harvesters from Attawapiskat First Nation continue to regularly hunt caribou, goose, and fish along the Attawapiskat River, while tending trap lines throughout the region (Berkes et al., 1994; Whiteman, 2004). Their activities go beyond subsistence hunting and fishing, as these comprise an important part of local culture and identity (Inf. #2, 4).

The Hudson's Bay Company introduced the commercial fur trapping economy in the late 17th century when they established a trading post in Fort Albany. The post in Attawapiskat was established toward the end of the 19th century (Honigmann 1953:816).

Attawapiskat was also once an outpost of Revillon Frères.

Education

Elders now living in Attawapiskat reported that in the 1930s and 1940s, they sent their children to Saint Anne's Residential School in Fort Albany (1936–1964). At the time there was no school in Attawapiskat. The same group of elders described the first school in Attawapiskat, built by the missionaries. It initially operated as a summer school that was only open in July and August so that it would not interfere with traditional life. Attawapiskat School, designed in 1951 by Lennox Grafton, who was one of the first Canadian women architects, opened in 1953.

Primary school students attended J.R. Nakogee School, which was constructed in the 1970s and opened in 1976. J.R. Nakogee School was closed on May 11, 2000, because of site contamination and possible health problems attributed to a massive diesel leak that had occurred in 1979. The students and staff have since been using portables for classes.

Secondary school students attend Vezina Secondary School, which was established in the early 1990s with additions built in following years. The secondary school was founded by John B. Nakogee in 1991 and it was named after Father Rodigue Vezina, a local Catholic priest who has served the community since 1975. Before the high school was opened in 1991, high school students had to go to Timmins, North Bay, or Ottawa for their studies.

As noted above, in May 2000, the First Nation was forced to close its elementary school and the community's students were educated in a series of portables. Money that had been allocated for the renovation of the 25-year-old frame school was used to pay for construction of eight double and three single portable classrooms. The facilities were basic, with none of the supplementary resources available to schools in other parts of the province. A new school was promised by the Minister of Indian and Northern Affairs in the summer of 2000, but no action was taken for several years. The Education Authority's Chairman summed up the community's plight by saying: "We just want what any other parent would want for their children – a safe school." A study by B. H. Martin indicates that the total area available for instruction is only about 50% of the space allocated in Indian Affairs' School Space Accommodation Standards.

Beginning in 2007, local teenager Shannen Koostachin launched "Education Is a Human Right", an activist campaign to publicize the lack of educational opportunities for First Nations youth. Koostachin was killed in a car accident near New Liskeard, where she was attending high school, in 2010. The campaign was subsequently renamed Shannen's Dream in her memory, and continues to operate. The campaign was the subject of Mohawk filmmaker Alanis Obomsawin's award-winning 2013 documentary film Hi-Ho Mistahey!

Attawapiskat First Nation marked the ground breaking for a new elementary school on June 22, 2012. Assembly of First Nations National Chief Shawn Atleo congratulated the community that day. On September 8, 2014, the new Kattawapiskak Elementary School was officially opened.

On May 1, 2013, officials announced the closure of all schools in the community because of flooding.

2016 suicide crisis

A state of emergency was declared after eleven people attempted suicide on April 9, 2016.  A document signed by Chief Bruce Shisheesh and eight councillors reflects that there were twenty-eight suicide attempts during March 2016. More than one hundred fifty people attempted suicide between September 2015 and April 2016, and a person died.

Reasons cited for the many suicide attempts among the youth were: overcrowding, with 14 to 15 people living in one home; bullying at school; residential schools; and physical, sexual and drug abuse. Health Canada provided $340,860 for mental health and wellness programs and $9,750 for the National Aboriginal Youth Suicide Prevention Strategy, which the reserve claimed was inadequate. They said they were overwhelmed. Local hospitals, which were already in poor condition, struggled to treat the people attempting suicide, in addition to already ill patients.

Geography

Attawapiskat is a coastal community in the western Hudson Bay Lowland, a vast wetland located between the Canadian Shield and James Bay and Hudson Bay.

The vegetation is typically subarctic, with a mostly coniferous forest (stunted black spruce and tamarack) in the muskeg. Wildlife includes geese, ducks, caribou, moose, beaver, bear, wolves, wolverine, marten, rabbit, muskrat, otter, and other species.

Winter roads constructed each December link Attawapiskat First Nation with Fort Albany First Nation, Kashechewan, Moosonee, and Moose Factory to the south. (Minkin 2008:1)

The fertile soil ( deep) is underlain by clay and silt. It is normal for the Attawapiskat River to rise  during spring break-up; on rare occasions the community has had to deal with recurring partial and complete flooding.

Geology
The Attawapiskat kimberlite field is a field of kimberlite pipes in the Canadian Shield located astride the Attawapiskat River on Attawapiskat First Nation land. It is thought to have formed about 180 million years ago in the Jurassic period, when the North American Plate moved westward over a centre of upwelling magma called the New England hotspot, also referred to as the Great Meteor hotspot.

The area is composed of 18 kimberlite pipes of the Attawapiskat kimberlite field, 16 of which are diamondiferous. The Victor Mine was developed on top of the Victor pipe. Mines from Victor Main and Victor Southwest have appeared close enough to the surface to be used in an open-pit mine. The Victor Kimberlite is a composition of pyroclastic crater facies and hypabyssal facies, and is considered to have a highly variable diamond grade.

Mining
De Beers Canada officially opened the Victor Diamond Mine, Ontario's first ever diamond mine on July 26, 2008. De Beers has spent approximately $1 billion on construction of the mine. The mine expected to produce  of diamonds a year.Traditional harvesters from Attawapiskat First Nation regularly hunt caribou, goose, and fish along the Attawapiskat River, while tending trap lines throughout the region (Berkes et al., 1994; Whiteman, 2004). Like many other northern Cree communities, these traditional activities are more than subsistence, comprising an important part of local culture and identity (Inf. #2, 4). Therefore, the community leadership was very concerned with the proposed development of the Victor mine, and, at De Beers' invitation, sought to ensure that any environmental impacts of the mine would be effectively mitigated.An Impact-Benefit Agreement (IBA) was signed with community leaders in 2005 with Danny Metatawabin, acting as coordinator for the Impact-Benefit Agreement (IBA) between De Beers and Attawapiskat. Community members later protested the agreement through demonstrations and roadblocks, claiming that the community's share of the "bounty from the mine isn't getting back to the community." De Beers has negotiated a lease area. Although it is acknowledged that the mine is on Attawapiskat traditional land, the royalties from Victor Mine flow to the Province of Ontario, not Attawapiskat First Nation. They have 500 full-time employees, with 100 from Attawapiskat First Nation. De Beers also employs Attawapiskat First Nation in winter road construction. The "mine employ[s] 100 people from Attawapiskat at any one time. It generates about $400 million in annual revenue for the company. " Sub-contractors from Attawapiskat First Nation also work for the mine.

The company has transferred about $10.5 million to a trust fund held by Attawapiskat as of January 2011. The Attawapiskat Trust, established January 1, 2007, receives payments made by De Beers Canada and Attawapiskat Limited Partnership (ALP) as part of the Victor Diamond Project Impact and Benefits Agreement (November 3, 2005-11-03) (Financial Statements Attawapiskat Trust 2012 p. 4). The beneficiary of the trust includes "all members of Attawapiskat on a collective and undivided basis (Financial Statements Attawapiskat Trust 2012 p. 4)."

Victor was forecast to have a "17-year cradle-to-grave life. That includes construction, an estimated 12 years of operation and then winding down to closure and rehabilitation of the site (Grech 2011-06-22)." In an interview with CBC reporter Megan Thomas in Sudbury, Ontario (CBC 2013-02-06), De Beers' Victor Mine spokesperson explained that Victor Mine could be exhausted by 2018 as was originally anticipated. It would take several years to close the mine completely. It is not economically viable with present-day technology to mine the deeper remaining 40 metres of diamond-bearing layers. However, the mine had produced at a high level of performance leading to "[f]urther exploration of the site" with the "hope that De Beers will uncover another source of diamonds within close proximity of the existing operation." Tom Ormsby, claimed that "The high quality of the Victor diamonds and the vastness of the Canadian shield points to great potential for another diamond mine being developed in northeastern Ontario." The "Canadian Shield has great potential to host diamonds" Canada's potential "appears to be at least twice as good as what southern Africa has held for potential for diamonds (Grech 2011-06-22)."

"A federal review of the relationship between De Beers' Victor mine and Attawapiskat showed that government support for training and capacity did not start soon enough to deal with the huge lack of skills in the First Nation."

Demographics

There are over 2,800 members of Attawapiskat First Nation, but the local on-reserve population was 1,549 according to the 2011 census. More than a third of the members of the Attawapiskat First Nation who still live on their home reserve are under the age of 19 and three-quarters are under the age of 35 (2010-12-03). Altogether, 5% of the community, 101 people, have attempted suicide over the seven months from September 2015 to April 2016.

Language

Almost all of the Aboriginal population of Attawapiskat speak the Swampy Cree language, one of the varieties of the Cree language, as their first language. Many elders understand very little English; they speak Cree and other Aboriginal languages. Some of these elders, such as Shano Fireman, self-identify as Inninew (person, part of the people Cree).

Religion
St. Ignatius Catholic Church, built in 1935, was the only place of "westernized" worship in Attawapiskat for many years and also maintains the local cemetery. St. Ignatius is located within the Roman Catholic Archdiocese of Keewatin–Le Pas. A second large burial grounds, St. Mary Cemetery, is located in the west end of town.

Other places of "westernized" worship are two Pentecostal places of worship.

Land use and occupancy

"[A]ncestors of today's Attawapiskat band occupied all the territory from the Kapiskau River in the south, to Hudson Bay (Cape Henrietta Maria) in the north, and from Akimiski Island in the east to Lake Mississa (150 miles inland) to the west. This has been contended by the present day chief and council [oral history], is supported by documentation in the archives of the HBC [Hudson's Bay Company], and was documented by Honigmann [1948]."

A land use study was carried out "jointly by the Research Program for Technology Assessment in Subarctic Ontario (TASO), the Mushkegowuk Council, its constituent First Nations, and the Omushkegowuk Harvesters Association. The overall purpose of the project was to help the regional Council and its associations develop a strategy for natural resource co-management, self-government, and sustainable regional development. In 1990 Dr. Fikret Berkes, Distinguished Professor and Canada Research Chair at the University of Manitoba, and a team of academics interviewed 925 aboriginal hunters from eight communities (Attawapiskat, Moose Factory, Moosonee, New Post, Fort Albany, Kashechewan, Peawanuck and Fort Severn) of the Mushkegowuk region, Hudson and James Bay Lowland. However, the activity pattern of Omushkego (West Main) Cree harvesters has changed much over the decades; contemporary harvesting involves numerous short trips of a few days' duration instead of the traditional long trips. Although the First Nations control only  (0.36% of the region) as Indian reserve land, they continue to use large parts of their traditional territory (Berkes et al. 1995:81)."

In her Masters thesis (1998) Jacqueline Hookimaw-Witt, a Muskego-Cree, interviewed elders from Attawapiskat who described in great detail ways in which they continued to harvest, fish and hunt for food, clothing, crafts and subsistence to complement store-bought items.<ref name=HookimawWittMA>{{cite thesis |type=MA Canadian Heritage and Development Studies, Trent University |location=Peterborough, Ontario |date=1997 |url=http://www.collectionscanada.gc.ca/obj/s4/f2/dsk2/tape15/PQDD_0016/MQ30219.pdf |title=Keenebonanoh Keemoshominook Kaeshe Peemishikhik Odaskiwakh We stand on the graves of our ancestors: Native interpretations of Treaty # 9 with Attawapiskat elders }}</ref> Hookimaw-Witt was the first Muskego-Cree to earn a doctorate.

Infrastructure crisis

Water and infrastructure crisis

Prior to the 1970s clean potable water from the Attawapiskat River and Monument Channel was obtained using buckets and pails. There was no running water.

When in 1976, AANDC recommended that the community water supply should come not from the river but from an inland lake (slough) just northeast of the hamlet, community members using traditional ecological knowledge (TEK) were aware that the water intake site proposed was too high in organics. They were right and no filtration system since then has proven adequate to control the quantities of organics without over-compensation with chemicals. Two consecutive treatment plants have failed, causing health problems. According to GENIVAR senior engineer, Rod Peters (2012), "The real problem is that the dissolved organic carbon (DOC) level is just too high to start. When you chlorinate the filtered water, trihalomethanes (THMs) and haloacetic acid (HAA5s) are formed within five minutes of contact." As well there's bromide in the raw water from the slough which reacts with the ozonate bromide used in the filtration process, turning to "bromate, which is a carcinogen."

"Not only, then, did the original design not work properly, but it presented potential health hazards. Technically, the filtration system in Attawapiskat right now will not be able to bring water to compliance with the recommended drinking water quality guidelines for Health Canada", Peters confirms.

Attawapiskat has been plagued with water "supply, treatment, and distribution challenges" since at least 1992, according to Peters. In c. 2009 GENIVAR was asked by the community and Aboriginal and Northern Affairs Canada (AANDC, then INAC) "to identify a suitable water intake site on the Attawapiskat River" (Freek 2012).

In March 2012 there was a Health Canada advisory warning residents to "minimize their exposure to household tap water". This means bottled water for most residents. Boiling water does not make it safe to drink because it does not remove the THMs. Exposure to tap water has to be limited and filters only help in some cases.

Housing and infrastructure crisis
Homes are mainly pre-fabricated wooden structures with newer trailer units arriving after the 2011 floods.

On October 28, 2011, the Attawapiskat First Nations leadership declared a state of emergency in response to dropping temperatures, and the resulting health and safety concerns due to inadequate housing. Many residents were still living in tents, trailers and temporary shelters, and many residences and public buildings lacked running water and electricity. In one case, children, the elderly, and the ill were sleeping in rooms just a few feet away from a 2009 raw sewage spill that had not been adequately cleaned. In his 2011 statement published on the United Nations site, James Anaya, the UN special rapporteur on indigenous peoples, said that many residents in the Attawapiskat First Nation community of "live in unheated shacks or trailers that lack running water." Anaya said that "aboriginal communities face higher rates of poverty, and poorer health, education and employment outcomes than non-aboriginals in Canada."

Attawapiskat residents were evacuated during flood conditions in May 2009. The sole elementary school building, a state-of-the-art construction in 1976, was closed in 2000 because of toxic fumes from a 1979 diesel spill.

Along with 300 houses, there are five tents and 17 sheds used for housing. Trailers that house 90 people cost $100,000 a year to maintain.

Aboriginal Affairs Minister John Duncan claimed that officials in his department were unaware of Attawapiskat's housing problems until October 28, 2011, despite having visited the community many times that year.

In November, 2011, a spokesperson for the Department of Aboriginal Affairs stated that the reserve had received a commitment of $500,000 to renovate five vacant housing units, and that it had already received "a significant boost from Canada's Economic Action Plan and funding dedicated to a new subdivision, of which 44 houses have been completed". The Prime Minister stated that the Attawapiskat First Nation had received $90 million in transfer payments since the federal Conservative Party was elected in 2006. On December 30, 2012, the Department of Aboriginal Affairs and Northern Development stated that $131 million will have been spent on Attawapiskat from 2006 to the end of fiscal year 2012–13, which includes 60 houses that have been renovated or newly constructed; a new school is also under construction.

The $90 million in transfer payments referred to by the Prime Minister is an aggregate figure, encompassing more than just housing. This amount includes all federal funding for Attawapiskat over 5 years, which includes education, health care, social services, housing and many other necessities. All of these programs require infrastructure and human resources that are also included in the total. It is estimated that $84 million is needed for housing alone in Attawapiskat.

The crisis is the subject of a 2012 documentary by First Nations filmmaker Alanis Obomsawin, The People of the Kattawapiskak River, and the 2015 documentary After the Last River by Victoria Lean. Obomsawin was present in the community in 2011, working on another film for the National Film Board of Canada, when the housing issue came to national attention. The Attawapiskat band received a total estimated revenue of $34 million in 2011: $17.6 million from the federal government, $4.4 million from the provincial government, and income derived from non-governmental sources.

Cost of living

The cost of living in Attawapiskat is quite high, because of the expense of shipping goods to the community.

Local stores include the Northern Store and M. Koostachin & Sons (1976). Prior to January 2013, more than a third of the residents occasionally placed orders for perishables and other goods (except alcohol) which were shipped in via aircraft from Timmins, and for which the residents made prepayments with money orders. When their orders arrived, the residents had to pick them up at the local airport. For example, six apples and four small bottles of juice cost $23.50 (2011-12-01).

The price of gasoline is considerably higher than the provincial average. When the fuel is shipped via winter road, the prices of gasoline and propane tend to drop slightly.

It costs $250,000 to build a house in Attawapiskat. The cost of renovating one condemned house is $50,000–100,000. A majority of the community members have updated their heating needs, while many households still use dry firewood. Firewood in Attawapiskat costs $150 and $200 a cord, and a cord will heat a winter-bound tent for only a week, or at most 10 days.

Timeline
1867 Constitution Act 1867, originally enacted as The British North America Act, 1867, a major part of Canada's Constitution, by which the federal government has exclusive authority to legislate on matters pertaining to "Indians, and Lands reserved for Indians." Aboriginal Affairs and Northern Development Canada (AANDC), formerly known as Indian and Northern Affairs Canada (INAC), has been the main federal organization exercising this authority (OAG 2011-06-04 p. 4).The Prime Minister of Canada changed the name of Indian and Northern Affairs Canada (INAC) to Aboriginal Affairs and Northern Development Canada (AANDC) in June 2011.
1979 – 30,000 gallons of diesel leaked from underground pipes was spilled underneath the recently built J.R. Nagokee School that houses grades 1–8 (1976). It was the largest spill in Northern Ontario.

2000 – Liberal Minister of Aboriginal Affairs and Northern Development (Canada) Robert Nault agreed in 2000 to begin plans for a new school. Two successive Aboriginal Affairs and Northern Development ministers, Andy Scott and Jim Prentice, also promised a new school for Attawapiskat. You can read the full chronology of seven years of negotiations on the departmental website. On April 1, 2008, the new minister, Chuck Strahl, informed the Attawapiskat First Nation Education Authority (AFNEA) that Ottawa would not finance the new school after all.
May 11, 2000 – J.R. Nagokee Elementary School closed due to health problems relating to the 1979 diesel spill. Since then the elementary school students are in portables.

December 8, 2004 – During his 2004 mission in Canada, Rodolfo Stavenhagen, UNESCO Special Rapporteur, observed first-hand the substandard conditions of on-reserve housing which included deteriorated units, lack of heating and insulation, leakage of pipes and toxic mould.
November 4, 2005 – The Attawapiskat First Nation and De Beers Canada Inc. are unanimous in their decision to sign an Impact Benefit Agreement with De Beers Group to break ground on Ontario's first diamond mine. The mine began construction in early 2006 at a cost of approximately $982 million. Chief Mike Carpenter of Attawapiskat said: "We look forward to working with De Beers as the Victor project progresses and produces Ontario's first diamonds. While we are concerned about the impacts of the project and the changes it will bring to our community, we are confident that the agreement will be implemented in the spirit of partnership that we have established with De Beers Canada." The Impact Benefit Agreement sets out how the community will benefit with respect to employment and business opportunities, training and education, sound environmental management and financial compensation for loss of the use of the land while it is being mined.
November 1, 2007 – UNHCHR Special Rapporteur, Mr. Miloon Kothari, noted that overcrowded and inadequate housing conditions, as well as difficulties to access basic services, including water and sanitation, are major problems for Aboriginal peoples. He called for changes in federal and provincial government, legislation, policies and budgetary allocation for Aboriginal people.
December 2007 – The new Indian Affairs and Northern Development Minister cancelled the plans for a new school, claiming there were other communities who took priority and that they were no health and safety concerns in Attawapiskat.
May 2008 – Hundreds of people are evacuated from the community after a state of emergency is declared. The threat stems from the possibility of ice jams in the Attawapiskat River and subsequent flooding.
 2009 – Members of the Attawapiskat First Nation blocked a winter road near the DeBeers Victor Diamond Mine to protest the fact that the Attawapiskat First Nation live in such impoverished conditions alongside this billion-dollar project.
April 2009 – It was revealed in a 2012 audit that Canada Mortgage and Housing Corporation (CMHC) only conducted one physical condition review of Attawapiskat First Nation housing units during the period from April 1, 2005, to November 2011. The April 2009 review was conducted on a very small sample in a single 27-unit housing project built in 1990 and 1994. These units had "poor indoor air quality, high water table and overcrowding." CMHC did not share this report with Aboriginal Affairs and Northern Development (Indian Affairs and Northern Development).
August 21, 2009 – Community members travelled to Toronto to confront De Beers Canada about the growing prosperity of the company and the growing poverty in the community.
 July 11, 2009 – A massive sewage flood dumps waste into eight buildings that housed 90 people. DeBeers donated and retrofitted two construction accommodation trailers intended as a short-term stop-gap measure, until the homes could be remedied or replaced. They are still housing 90 people who share four stoves and six washrooms.
October 14, 2009 – Chief Theresa Hall raises concerns about the federal government's lack of response to the housing crisis in Attawapiskat caused by the sewage back-up. The government had claimed they had committed $700,000 to repair homes.
2011-06 The Auditor General of Canada reported that there was a chronic and persistent "lack of clarity about service levels", and lack of legislation supporting programs regarding education, health, and drinking water. Federal programs and services developed exclusively on the basis of policy, not legislation, created confusion about federal responsibility and adequate funding (OAG 2011-06-04:3), lack of an appropriate funding mechanism, and lack of organizations to support local service delivery on First Nations reserves across Canada.
October 28, 2011 – Attawapiskat First Nations Chief Theresa Spence calls a state of emergency for the third time in three years. Aboriginal Affairs Minister John Duncan claimed that officials in his department were unaware of Attawapiskat's housing problems until October 28, despite having visited the community many times this year.
December 1, 2011 – The Canadian Red Cross mobilized to help meet immediate needs in the community of Attawapiskat. The Red Cross continues to work closely with public authorities and the community to identify and address urgent, short-term needs. At the request of the community the Red Cross will also take on a donation management role to support these needs as identified.
January 14, 2012: Attawapiskat First Nation Housing Manager, Monique Suntherland, signed an affidavit on January 14, 2012, with numerous items of evidence, including evidence dating back to 2002, with official signed requests from social services, James Bay Hospital, medical doctors, etc. detailing a case-by-case urgent need for housing, particularly for the ill and elderly, citing problems with mould and mildew, over-crowding, and a lack of heat and running water. It included the description of one residence 300 sq feet in size, housing three people, which was more like a bush camp.
2012: The federal government "rushed 22 pre-fabricated homes to the community."
September 28, 2012: The "Audit of the AANDC and Attawapiskat First Nation (AFN) Management Control Framework" by Deloitte and Touche LLP, covering the period between April 1, 2005, and November 30, 2011, was completed. In an unusual move Aboriginal Affairs and Northern Development published it online. The total amount of all AANDC funding to Attawapiskat First Nation, which includes health, education, infrastructure, housing and administration, etc., was approximately $104M over that time. The area under scrutiny was the c. $8.3M for "housing-related activities through the Capital Facilities and Maintenance (CFM) program, which included $6.85M for housing maintenance; $1M for immediate housing needs; and, $450K for housing renovations under Canada's Economic Action Plan." One of the positive outcomes was the observation that AANDC, CMHC, and Attawapiskat First Nation "worked in partnership at the regional level to determine allocations of housing funds for the Attawapiskat First Nation." Recommendations included changes regarding loan eligibility, improvements in reporting, and book-keeping, for example, CMHC Physical Condition Reviews must be shared with AANDC. It was noted that there is a chronic problem with collection of rent in arrears, which impedes loan payments to CMHC, and there are the challenges of evicting tenants in this impoverished, remote northern community already plagued by overcrowding.
February 5, 2013: The network of trailers that are usually used to house employees at remote work sites, donated by De Beers, are in disrepair. Attawapiskat First Nation Housing Manager, Monique Suntherland, explained that the materials needed to renovate the trailers still have to be shipped up the ice road in February, but the work had begun. "Sutherland said it's frustrating that the reserve is working on yet another short-term solution ... She said the community needs 62 new homes, and 155 more need renovations, referring to a housing plan from 2010 ... Sutherland said nothing in the plan has come to fruition, and the waiting list only gets longer as the population grows. In the long term, the band has also been asked to provide a new housing plan to the federal government.(CBC 2013-02-07)."
 March 2013: The construction of the new Attawapiskat First Nation elementary school began with an overall cost of $31 million funded by AANDC. Completion is expected by June 2014.
 November 21, 2013: A fire damaged a portion of the East End Trailers in Attawapiskat, displacing 80 community members. A state of emergency was declared. Thirty people had to be evacuated to Kapuskasing for several weeks while repairs were undertaken.  The "shelter complex was donated to the community by De Beers Canada in 2007 to provide temporary emergency shelter for the community."

Governance

Attawapiskat was officially recognized by the Government of Canada under the Treaty 9 document. Although the original document was signed in the years 1905 and 1906, it only included the communities south of the Albany River in northern Ontario. Attawapiskat was included when adhesions were made to the treaty to include the communities north of the Albany River. Attawapiskat was numbered as Attawapiskat Indian Reserve 91 as part of Treaty 9. The treaty set aside reserve lands on the Ekwan River, a parallel river north of the Attawapiskat River that drains into James Bay, totalling 27 040.10 hectares. In time, it was decided by local leaders to establish the community in its present location on the Attawapiskat River instead. This was due to an existing trading post and better access to James Bay shipping routes from this location. The new reserve, which contains 235.8 hectares, was then numbered Attawapiskat Indian Reserve 91A.

Local leadership is an elected government of a chief, a deputy chief and twelve councillors who serve three-year terms. The current chief (2022) is David Nakogee. The band council was under Third Party Intervention for part of 2011–2012. While the federal government had preemptively removed the third-party manager, a Federal Court decision later deemed the Third Party Management arrangement 'unreasonable'.

Attawapiskat First Nation is part of the regional Mushkegowuk Council, an Aboriginal political group representing the James Bay Mushkego or Omushkego Cree. The community and the Council are together represented under the Political Territorial Organization, Nishnawbe Aski Nation (NAN), which represents 50 First Nations in Northern Ontario. NAN is the representative political body for the First Nations that are part of Treaty 9. The current Grand Chief of Nishnabwe-Aski Nation is Harvey Yesno. The Assembly of First Nations (AFN) is the national representative organization of the 630 First Nation's communities in Canada.

The reserve is within the federal riding of Timmins—James Bay, and the provincial riding of Mushkegowuk—James Bay. , the current provincial Member of Parliament (MPP) is Guy Bourgouin (NDP) and federal member of parliament is Charlie Angus (NDP).

Audit investigation (2005–2011)
Grand Chief Stan Louttit of Mushkegowuk Council observed that "At the height of the Attawapiskat housing crisis over a year ago, the Attawapiskat First Nation made it very clear to the government that they would welcome a forensic audit to be carried out. The government chose not to conduct such an audit only to settle for a limited audit by the firm of Deloitte. The "Audit of the AANDC and Attawapiskat First Nation (AFN) Management Control Framework" by Deloitte and Touche LLP was completed on September 28, 2012. Chief Teresa Spence took office in 2010 but the audit's investigation covers the period between April 1, 2005, and November 30, 2011. Attawapiskat First Nation (AFN) voluntarily agreed to the audit. The federal government had commissioned the audit in December 2011 in response to a declaration of a state of emergency regarding a long-standing and continual crisis of housing. According to Aboriginal Affairs and Northern Development, "only 46 of Attawapiskat's 316 housing units are considered adequate, while another 146 need major work and 122 are placement."

A CBC radio report noted that insensitive timing of the announcement to CBC and the online publication of the audit just before a controversial, highly publicized and much anticipated meeting on January 11, between Prime Minister Stephen Harper and First Nations leadership. For Grand Chief Stan Louttit of Mushkegowuk Council, the meeting was to be "an important and critical opportunity for dialogue and to work towards some key deliverables into the future." For others was a "hopeful sign of a new beginning in building nation to nation respectful relationships" and "the beginning of implementing the 1996 Report of the Royal Commission on Aboriginal Peoples." The timing did "not reflect too well on the government." CBC correspondent Terry Milewski reported that the auditors did "not allege fraud" but raised "questions about bookkeeping" on the part of the federal government and the Band.

The audit "shows an unacceptable level of expenditures for which proper documentation was not provided." Aboriginal and Northern Affairs representative revealed that of the 316 homes, 85% are "unfit for human habitation".(CBC 2013-01-07). The total amount of all AANDC funding to Attawapiskat First Nation which includes health, education, infrastructure, housing and administration, [notes 2] etc. was approximately $104M over that time (Deloitte and Touche 2012-09-28 p. 6). The area under scrutiny by the audit, was the c. $8.3M for "housing-related activities through the Capital Facilities and Maintenance (CFM) program, which included $6.85M for housing maintenance; $1M for immediate housing needs; and, $450K for housing renovations under Canada's Economic Action Plan." One of the positive outcomes was the observation that AANDC, CMHC, and Attawapiskat First Nation, "worked in partnership at the regional level to determine allocations of housing funds for the Attawapiskat First Nation."

It was revealed in the audit that Canada Mortgage and Housing Corporation (CMHC) only conducted one physical condition review of Attawapiskat First Nation housing units during the period from April 1, 2005, to November 2011. The April 2009 review was conducted on a very small sample in a single 27-unit housing project built in 1990 and 1994. These units had "poor indoor air quality, high water table and overcrowding." CMHC did not share this report with Aboriginal Affairs and Northern Development (Indian Affairs and Northern Development). Recommendations included changes regarding loan eligibility, improvements in reporting, book-keeping, for example, CMHC Physical Condition Reviews must be shared with AANDC. It was noted that there is a chronic problem with collection of rent in arrears which impedes loan payments to CMHC and the challenges of evicting tenants [54] in this impoverished, remote northern community already plagued by overcrowding. In it the auditors found "an average of 81 per cent of files did not have adequate supporting documents and over 60 per cent had no documentation of the reason for payment." Additionally, the letter delivered to Chief Spence stated the audit revealed "no evidence of due diligence on the part of Attawapiskat of funding provided by Aboriginal Affairs and Northern Development Canada for housing projects and Health Canada for health-related projects."

Economy and employment
Economic and employment opportunities are limited to work within the community, mainly in the service sector or for the local band council. There are only a handful of businesses in the town.

 De Beers Victor Mine
 Kataquapit's Inn – family-run hotel housing DeBeers workers
 Northern Store (with KFC/Pizza Hut Express outlet) and Warehouse (former store) – retail store
 Attawapiskat Band Council
 Attawapiskat Development Corporation
 Attawapiskat Airport
 April's Coffee Shop – converted trailer
 Kloxplex Studios (private)
 SIPC Development Incorporated
 DeBeers Marc Guevremont Training Centre – training staff for Victor Mine
 Attawapiskat Hospital
 WAHA Paramedic Service Base
 Attawapiskat Fire Rescue
 Attawapiskat Water Treatment Plant
 Attawapiskat Health Centre – outpatient clinic
 Vezina Secondary School
 J.R. Nakogee School – public school
 Kattawapiskak Elementary School – new school''
 CJBA-FM – local radio station
 M. Koostachin & Sons – retail store
 Hydro One – power generation and distribution
 Bell Canada – land line services
 Canada Post – postal services
 Attawapiskat First Nation Education Authority
 K-Net Services (Keewaytinook Okimakanak) – internet services
 Xittel – internet services
 Xplornet – internet services
 Parish Hall
 Northern Stores Residences

From 1927 to 1960, the Catholic Church's Oblate Mission operated a sawmill.

In 1901 the Hudson's Bay Company established a trading post and store in town. The Northern Store took over the operations from HBC in the 1980s.

Transportation

Air
Travel to Attawapiskat is accessible through Attawapiskat Airport year-round. The airport was opened in 1974, but air service in the community began in 1957. The airport is equipped with a gravel runway that was constructed in the 1970s.

Circa 2007, Thunder Airlines supplanted Air Creebec, as supplier of postal services and for shipping goods. Heavier goods are shipped into the community via a seasonal barge from Moosonee.

Rail
From Moosonee the Ontario Northland Railway runs south to Cochrane, with bus connections further south to Toronto and Southern Ontario.

Road

During the winter months, a "Winter Road" is constructed that connects the community to other coastal towns on the James Bay coast. The first roads were built by the province in 1956. Winter roads are temporary routes of transportation that are constructed mostly in January, February, March and even April throughout remote parts of Northern Ontario. The seasonal James Bay winter road connects the communities of Attawapiskat, Kashechewan, Fort Albany, Moosonee and Moose Factory. James Bay Winter Road is operated or managed by Kimesskanemenow Corporation. The Ontario Ministry of Transportation has an office and representative in the town.

Residents of several remote coastal communities often take advantage of the winter road to purchase goods and perishables, by making long trips to Moosonee. Residents drive cars, vans and small trucks (SUV or pickups), while some may use ATVs or bikes and snowmobiles in winter months. When the winter road is in good condition, the trip can take five hours to Kashechewan, one way. During the period when the winter road is open, certain community band members offer taxi services, shuttling between the communities. James Bay Winter Road is available in the winter months barring bad weather such as blizzards and heavy snowfalls, at which point access will be closed until the road is inspected and snow is plowed away.

Roads in town are not paved and are either dirt or gravel. Beyond the winter roads, none of the gravel roads connect beyond Attawapiskat.

Feasibility studies have been undertaken on the construction of a permanent all-season road to the communities. The project, if undertaken, will entail a "coastal road" connecting the four communities with each other, as well as a road to link the coastal road to the provincial highway system at Fraserdale, Kapuskasing or Hearst.

In January 2021, a new 311-kilometre James Bay Winter Ice Road was under construction, to connect Attawapiskat, Kashechewan, Fort Albany and Moosonee. It opened some time in winter 2021 and was said to accept loads up to 50,000 kilograms in weight. The road was operated by Kimesskanemenow LP, "a limited partnership between the four communities it connects".

Roads are generally unnamed (Airport Road, River Road, Meenish Road, 1A Street and 2nd Street are the few named streets) and most places in town use post office boxes for identification.

Community services

Utilities
Five Nations Energy Inc was created in 2001–2003 to distribute electricity from Hydro One from the Moosonee Substation. Prior to 2000 power was supplied by diesel generators located in Fort Albany.

Policing
Attawapiskat is policed by the Nishnawbe-Aski Police Service, an Aboriginal-based service that replaced the Ontario Provincial Police (OPP). This change took place in the early 1990s in most remote northern communities in Ontario. The community is served by the Attawapiskat detachment in the Northeast Region.

Healthcare
Basic health services are provided by nursing staff at the 15-bed Attawapiskat Hospital of Weeneebayko Area Health Authority (main wing in Moosonee, Ontario), a provincial hospital which provides sixteen beds for pediatric, medical/surgical and chronic care. The hospital replaced St. Mary's Hospital, established by the Catholic Church in 1951, in 1969. Health services are provided by a nursing staff. However, like other remote communities on the James Bay coast, there is no doctor in the community. A physician from Weeneebayko General Hospital in Moose Factory visits Attawapiskat, as well as other communities along the coast on a regular basis during each month. Patients with serious injuries, or those requiring surgery, must be transported to a larger centre for treatment. These emergency patients are transported by air ambulance airplane or helicopter to medical centres in Moose Factory, Timmins, Sudbury or Kingston, depending on their condition.

James Bay General Hospital was merged with federally operated Weeneebayko General Hospital to improve health care services in the region.

Attawapiskat Health Clinic provides additional outpatient health care services to the community and is located across the street from Weenebayko General Hospital Attawapiskat Wing.

On May 1, 2013, officials announced that the hospital was closed and evacuated because of flooding in the area.

Fire and EMS
Attawapiskat Fire Rescue consists of a fire department of nine (one fire chief, one lieutenant and seven firefighters) at one station with one pumper.

Pre-hospital medical care is provided by Weeneebayko Area Health Authority Paramedic Services, a service run by Weeneebayko Area Health Authority funded by the Ministry of Health and Long-Term Care. The community is served by one EMS base (#02) with two ambulances (one primary and one reserve) for the entire community. There are eight primary care paramedics stationed at this base which operates 24/7/365.

Canadian Ranger
Attawapiskat Canadian Ranger Patrol is a Canadian Ranger unit attached to the 3rd Canadian Ranger patrol group (based at CFB Borden) and was formed in 1994.

Community centres
Maytawaywin Authority provides recreational services at Reg Louttit Sportsplex, a community centre and sportsplex:

 ice rink
 community hall
 gym
 fields for football, soccer, baseball

A healing lodge, the Jules Mattinas Healing Lodge, is located northwest of Attawapiskat and connected by a road. The building's entrance is shaped as a teepee.

Media

Radio
 FM 89.9 – CKMT, First Nations community radio (relays CKWT-FM, Sioux Lookout)
 FM 101.5 – CBCA, CBC Radio One (relays CBCS-FM, Sudbury)

Television

Note: Many channels from TV shows public to community and up to 48 TV channels

Local television cable service is provided by Attawapiskat Development Corporation.

Telecommunications in the community is received from a tower located next to the hospital.

Notable people
Theresa Spence, the former Chief (2010–2015), brought Attawapiskat to international attention when she declared a state of emergency in 2011. She was a prominent figure in the Attawapiskat housing and infrastructure crisis, and other First Nations issues. Prior to serving as chief, she was the deputy chief of Attawapiskat.

Shannen Koostachin (1996–2010) Attawapiskat captured the hearts of Canadians in her struggle to call attention to the deficiencies in education in her home community. After her untimely death in a car accident Shannen's Dream was formed Shannen's Dream is a student- and youth-focused campaign designed to raise awareness about inequitable funding for First Nations children, and encourages supporters to write letters to their Member of Parliament, to the Minister of Aboriginal Affairs and Northern Development Canada, and to the Prime Minister of Canada. To accompany this movement, Timmins-James Bay MP Charlie Angus reintroduced Shannen's Dream as Motion 201 to the House of Commons of Canada on September 26, 2011. On February 27, 2012, the House of Commons unanimously voted in favour of the motion. She attended J.R. Nakogee elementary school, which had been housed in makeshift portables since 2000, when it was condemned and closed because of a decades-old fuel leak. By 2007, the federal government had backed away from a third commitment to building a new school for Attawapiskat. In response Shannen and others turned to YouTube and Facebook to launch the Students Helping Students campaign for a school for Attawapiskat. Shannen spoke out about the experiences of her community in newspapers, at conferences, and on the steps of Parliament Hill. In 2008, at the age of 12, she was nominated for the International Children's Peace Prize. Shannen and her older sister, Serena, moved hundreds of kilometres away from Attawapiskat to New Liskeard, Ontario, for high school. She died on June 1, 2010 in a car accident. Shannen's Dream Campaign has continued after her death.

Notes

References

Further reading
 
 
  Tom Ormsby, Director of Corporate Affairs for De Beers Canada and the Ontario MPP for the area, Gilles Bisson.

  This includes a valuable timeline of events related to the housing crisis.

External links
 
 Weeneebayko Health Ahtuskaywin regional health authority
 
 Aboriginal Affairs and Northern Development Canada profile

Communities in Kenora District
Nishnawbe Aski Nation
Cree reserves in Ontario
Hudson's Bay Company trading posts
Swampy Cree
Wetlands of Ontario
Mining in Ontario
1950 establishments in Canada
Road-inaccessible communities of Ontario
Health disasters in Canada